Janez Podobnik (born 17 September 1959) is a Slovenian conservative politician.

Early life 
Podobnik was born in the small town of Cerkno in western Slovenia, in what was then the Socialist Federal Republic of Yugoslavia. He studied medicine at the University of Ljubljana, where he graduated in 1984. From 1984 to 1990, he worked as a general physician in Idrija.

Political career 
He entered politics during the period of democratization known as the Slovenian spring. In 1990, he joined the Slovenian People's Party and was elected as the first non-communist mayor of Idrija after World War II. In 1992, he was elected to the Slovenian National Assembly. During the coalition government between the Slovenian People's Party and the left Liberal Democracy of Slovenia, Podobnik served as speaker of the National Assembly (1996–2000). In 1997, he unsuccessfully ran for president of Slovenia, but was defeated in a runoff by the incumbent Milan Kučan.

He was reelected to the parliament in 2000, and he served as the head of the parliament group of the Slovenian People's Party from 2000 to 2004. In 2003, he was elected president of the Slovenian People's Party. In 2004, the party entered the centre-right government led by Janez Janša, and Podobnik became minister of the environment. In November 2007, Podobnik resigned as president of the Slovenian People's Party, which was defeated in the parliamentary election in September 2008.

Personal life 
Podobnik is a devout Roman Catholic. He is married and has one child, Rok. His brother, Marjan Podobnik, also a politician, was the president of the Slovenian People's Party from 1992 to 2000, and deputy prime minister from 1997 to 2000.

References

1959 births
Living people
People from Cerkno
Presidents of the National Assembly (Slovenia)
Slovenian Roman Catholics
Environment ministers of Slovenia
Slovenian People's Party politicians
Slovenian general practitioners
University of Ljubljana alumni